The WWL Americas Championship (Campeonato de Las Américas de la WWL in Spanish) is a professional wrestling championship promoted by the World Wrestling League (WWL) promotion in Puerto Rico. The first champion was crowned on October 18, 2014, when Laredo Kid defeated BJ and Joe Bravo.

The championship is generally contested in professional wrestling matches, in which participants execute scripted finishes rather than contend in direct competition.

History

International exposure
On September 30, 2018, incumbent Navarro debuted for Colombia Pro Wrestling by retaining the title after getting disqualified against Coastal Championship Wrestling Southeastern Heavyweight Champion Cha Cha Charlie. During the first week of January 2019, "El Hombre Bestia" Enyel defended the WWL Americas Championship in appearances for Bronx Wrestling Federation in the Dominican Republic.

Title history

References

External links
 
 

Regional professional wrestling championships
World Wrestling League Championships